The Lex Aelia et Fufia  (the Aelian and Fufian Law) was established around the year 150 BC in the Roman Republic. The presumed subject of this legislation was the extension of the right of obnuntiatio, that is, reporting unfavorably concerning the omens observed at the Legislative Assemblies, thus forcing an end to public business until the next lawful day. This right, previously reserved to the College of Augurs, was extended to all of the magistrates, thus denying a key political advantage to politicians who were members of that College. This law was repealed in 58 BC by the Leges Clodiae.

See also 
Roman law
List of Roman laws

References

External links
The Roman Law Library, incl. Leges
Entry from Harry Thurston Peck, "Harpers Dictionary of Classical Antiquities" (from the Perseus Project)

Modern works 
 Tatum, W. Jeffrey. The Patrician Tribune: P. Clodius Pulcher. Studies in the History of Greece and Rome (University of North Carolina Press, 1999) hardcover 
 Fezzi, L: Il tribuno Clodio (Roma-Bari, Laterza, 2008) 

Roman law